Adolph, Prince of Nassau-Schaumburg (also known as Adolph of Nassau-Dillenburg; 23 January 1629 – 19 December 1676) was the founder of the short-lived Nassau-Schaumburg line.

He was the son of Louis Henry (1594–1662), Count of Nassau-Dillenburg, from 1654 Prince of Nassau-Dillenburg, and his first wife Catherine of Sayn-Wittgenstein (1588–1651).  As a younger son he received only the district of Driedorf from his father's inheritance.

In 1653, he married Elisabeth Charlotte (1640–1707), the daughter of Peter Melander, Count of Holzappel.  Via her, he inherited the County of Holzappel and the Lordship of Schaumburg.  He then styled himself Count of Nassau-Schaumburg and became the founder of the Nassau-Schaumburg line.  However, all his sons predeceased him, and when he died in 1676, Holzappel and Schaumburg fell to his son-in-law Lebrecht, Prince of Anhalt-Zeitz-Hoym, the founder of the Anhalt-Bernburg-Schaumburg-Hoym line.

Adolph and Elisabeth Charlotte had the following children:
 Catherine (b. 1659)
 Agnes (b. 1660)
 William Louis (b. 1661)
 Ernestine Charlotte (1662–1732), married:
 in 1678 William Maurice of Nassau-Siegen (1649–1691)
 Frederick Philip of Geuder-Rabensteiner (d. 13 May 1727), Councillor and Hofmeister at the court in Bernburg
 Joan Elisabeth (1663 – 9 February 1700), married in 1692 to Count Frederick Adolph of Lippe-Detmold
 Louise Henriette (1665-1665)
 Charles Henry (b. 1670)
 Charlotte (1673–1700), married in 1692 to Lebrecht, Prince of Anhalt-Zeitz-Hoym

Ancestors

References 
 Johann Samuel Ersch, Johann Gottfried Gruber: Allgemeine encyklopädie der wissenschaften und künste in alphabetischer Folge, Johann Friedrich Gleditsch, Leipzig 1818, p. 430 (Online)

External links 
 

Princes of Nassau
House of Nassau-Schaumburg
1629 births
1676 deaths
17th-century German people